Álvaro Fernando Erazo Latorre (born 15 August 1958) is a Chilean politician and physician. From December 2008 to March 2010, he served as Minister of Health.

References

1958 births
Living people
Chilean people
Chilean physicians
University of Chile alumni
Johns Hopkins University alumni
21st-century Chilean politicians
Socialist Party of Chile politicians